Giovanni Emblaviti (1638 – April 1722) was a Roman Catholic prelate who served as Bishop of Belcastro (1688–1722).

Biography
Giovanni Emblaviti was born in Bova, Italy in 1638 and ordained a priest on 24 September 1661.
On 31 May 1688, he was appointed during the papacy of Pope Innocent XI as Bishop of Belcastro.
On 7 June 1688, he was consecrated bishop by Stefano Giuseppe Menatti, Titular Bishop of Cyrene. 
He served as Bishop of Belcastro until his death in April 1722.

References

External links and additional sources
 (for Chronology of Bishops) 
 (for Chronology of Bishops) 

17th-century Italian Roman Catholic bishops
18th-century Italian Roman Catholic bishops
Bishops appointed by Pope Innocent XI
1638 births
1722 deaths